Iddari Lokam Okate is a 2019 Indian romantic drama film directed by G.R. Krishna and produced by Sirish under Dil Raju's Sri Venkateswara Creations. It's a remake of 2011 Turkish film Love Likes Coincidences. Starring Raj Tarun and Shalini Pandey, the film follows story of Varshini (Pandey) and her chance meetings with Mahi (Tarun). The music of the film is composed by Mickey J Meyer.

Plot
The story revolves around childhood sweethearts Mahi and Varsha who get separated when Varsha goes to city for further studies. 20 years later, Mahi runs a photo gallery and exhibits Varsha's childhood photo in it. The rest of the story deals with whether they meet and fall in love.

Cast
Raj Tarun as Mahi
Shalini Pandey as Varsha
Nassar as Ranga Rao, Varsha's grandfather
Master Bharath as Mahi's friend
Raja Chembolu as Rahul
Rohini as Varsha's mother
Shiju as Varsha's father
Prudhvi Raj as Mukesh
Siri Hanmanth as Varsha's friend
Kalpalatha as Mahi's mother
Appaji Ambarisha Darbha as Mahi's father
Master Roshan as young Mahi
Nethra as young Varsha
Satish Saripalli as Mahi's father's friend 
Sahithi Avancha as 15 year old Varsha
Master Nikhil (Nikhil Devadula) as 15 year old Mahi

Production 
Raj Tarun launched Iddari Lokam Okate in April 2019 with director G R Krishna, to be produced by Dil Raju and Sri Venkateswara Creations. Later Shalini Pandey was cast as leading lady. The filming began in May 2019 in Hyderabad.

Soundtrack 
The soundtrack is composed by Mickey J. Meyer.

Release 
The film was released on 25 December 2019.

References

External links

2010s Telugu-language films
2019 romantic comedy films
Indian romantic comedy films
2019 films

Sri Venkateswara Creations films
Films scored by Mickey J Meyer
Indian remakes of foreign films